Best-Of: Design of a Decade 2003–2013 is a greatest hits album by Anggun, released on 10 May 2013 by Sony Music Indonesia. It comprises some of Anggun's notable works since her departure from Columbia Records (part of Sony Music Entertainment) in 2003. A sequel to her previous Best-Of album in 2006, the album included only one song, "Saviour", appearing on the previous compilation. The album features four unreleased tracks in Indonesia—"Echo (You and I)" (Full English Version) from its French CD single, "Lie to Me" from the European edition of Echoes, as well as her collaborations with German musician Schiller, "Blind" and "Innocent Lies". Anggun also re-recorded her debut international single, "Snow on the Sahara", which was released as a single to promote the album. An uptempo dance track, the new version was produced by Lebanese-Canadian musician K.Maro.

Track listing

References

External links
 Anggun Official Site
 Anggunesia: Anggun Indonesian Fan Community
 Anggun World Fan Community

Anggun albums
2013 greatest hits albums